Fever is a 2016 Indian suspense thriller written and directed by Rajeev Jhaveri and produced by Ravi Agrawal, Mahesh Balekundri, Ajay Chabbria and Rajath Manjunath. The film features Gauahar Khan and Rajeev Khandelwal in the lead roles along with Gemma Atkinson, Caterina Murino and Ankita Makwana. The film was shot in Switzerland. Trailer of the film was released on 14 June 2016. The movie was released on 5 August 2016.

Plot 
The movie starts with the protagonist, a man named Armin Salem (Rajeev Khandelwal), recovering in the hospital after a car accident and is diagnosed as suffering from retrograde amnesia. There are only a few things that he remembers – his name, that he is originally from Paris and furthermore that he might have committed the murder of a woman named Rhea Wagner (Gemma Atkinson). He wants to know who he really is and he keeps repeating the same question to different characters. The answers are finally revealed.

He starts getting flashbacks and remembers the identity of a woman identifying herself as Kavya (Gauahar Khan) who keeps reappearing in his hallucinations along with Rhea. She then starts stalking him. Kavya's role in Armin's life is quite hazy but eventually the truth is revealed as to why she is too close to Armin. Things become interesting when Armin meets Rhea, and remembers that he is Karan who is a writer and all the clips that he sees are the hidden shades of the writer himself. After losing the memory of Karan, the writer, he adopted the memory of Armin who used to work as a contract killer in his book. He is shown to be very smooth with the ladies and is also very quick with a gun.

He also finds out that the woman named Kavya is none other than his wife Pooja. When Pooja finds out that Karan has lost his memory, she introduces herself with a fake identity to regain her husband as they were going through a rough patch in their marriage. She ends up killing a woman named Grace Soni (Ankita Makwana), who is revealed to be Karan's girlfriend. She then manipulates him into thinking that someone is trying to trap him and that she will help him in every way possible. Finally, Pooja's motive is revealed when she helps Armin dump the dead body of Grace and flee from the scene. Pooja admits that it was the fever of her inner rage that gave her the courage to love someone despite not being loved back.

Cast 
 Rajeev Khandelwal as Armin Salem / Karan Warrier
 Gauahar Khan as Kavya Chaudhary / Pooja Warrier 
 Gemma Atkinson as Rhea Wagner
 Victor Banerjee as Dr. David Roy
 Caterina Murino as Irina Caro
 Ankita Makwana as Grace Soni

Soundtrack

References

External links 
 

2016 films
2010s Hindi-language films
2010s erotic thriller films
Indian erotic thriller films
Films shot in Switzerland
Films scored by Shamir Tandon
Films scored by Tony Kakkar
Films scored by Tanishk Bagchi